Saturday Club may refer to:
Saturday Club (TV series),  a children's television show produced in Australia
 Saturday Club (BBC radio), a pop music programme
 Saturday Club (Boston, Massachusetts), an informal monthly gathering of writers, scientists, philosophers, historians and others
 Saturday Club (Wayne, Pennsylvania)
 Saturday Club (Kolkata)